The 1954 Japan Series was the Nippon Professional Baseball (NPB) championship series for the 1954 season. It was the fifth Japan Series and featured the Pacific League champions, the Nishitetsu Lions, against the Central League champions, the Chunichi Dragons. This would be the Dragons' last championship until 2007, when they defeated the Hokkaido Nippon-Ham Fighters.

Summary

Matchups

Game 1
Saturday, October 30, 1954 – 1:34 pm at Nagoya Baseball Stadium in Nagoya, Aichi Prefecture

Game 2
Sunday, October 31, 1954 – 1:34 pm at Nagoya Baseball Stadium in Nagoya, Aichi Prefecture

Game 3
Tuesday, November 2, 1954 – 1:36 pm at Heiwadai Stadium in Fukuoka, Fukuoka Prefecture

Game 4
Wednesday, November 3, 1954 – 1:35 pm at Heiwadai Stadium in Fukuoka, Fukuoka Prefecture

Game 5
Thursday, November 4, 1954 – 1:32 pm at Heiwadai Stadium in Fukuoka, Fukuoka Prefecture

Game 6
Saturday, November 6, 1954 – 1:33 pm at Nagoya Baseball Stadium in Nagoya, Aichi Prefecture

Game 7
Sunday, November 7, 1954 – 1:32 pm at Nagoya Baseball Stadium in Nagoya, Aichi Prefecture

See also
1954 World Series

References

Japan Series
Japan Series
Japan series
Japan series